Yevgeny Ivanov may refer to:
Evgeni Ivanov (volleyball) (born 1974), Bulgarian volleyball player
Yevgeny Ivanov (spy) (1926–1994), Russian naval attache and spy in London
Yevgeni Viktorovich Ivanov (born 1964), Russian politician
Yevgeni Yuryevich Ivanov (born 1979), Russian footballer
Evgeni Ivanov (basketball) (born 1993), Bulgarian basketball player
Yevgeny Nilovich Ivanov (ru) (1921–1945), Hero of the Soviet Union